Norman Alexis "Bub" McMillan (October 5, 1895 – September 28, 1969) was an American Major League Baseball shortstop, third baseman and second baseman with the New York Yankees, Boston Red Sox, St. Louis Browns and the Chicago Cubs between 1922 and 1929. He batted and threw right-handed.

McMillan was born in Latta, South Carolina and died in Marion, South Carolina at age 73.

External links

1895 births
1969 deaths
Major League Baseball third basemen
Baseball players from South Carolina
Chicago Cubs players
New York Yankees players
St. Louis Browns players
Boston Red Sox players
Clemson Tigers baseball players
People from Latta, South Carolina